Hugo Grenier was the defending champion but lost in the first round to Otto Virtanen.

Hugo Gaston won the title after defeating Henri Laaksonen 6–7(6–8), 7–5, 6–1 in the final.

Seeds

Draw

Finals

Top half

Bottom half

References

External links
Main draw
Qualifying draw

Open International de Tennis de Roanne - 1